Jessica Amy Knappett (born 28 November 1984) is an English comedian, actress, and writer. She is best known as the creator, writer, executive producer, and star of the E4 sitcom Drifters, as well as her role as Lisa in The Inbetweeners Movie and various panel show appearances.

Early life 
Jessica Amy Knappett was born on 28 November 1984 in Bingley, West Yorkshire. She attended Woodhouse Grove School in nearby Apperley Bridge before studying Drama and English at the University of Manchester. She was a co-founder of Lady Garden, a sketch comedy group formed in Manchester in 2005. The group performed at the Edinburgh Festival Fringe in 2008, 2009, and 2010. They also toured throughout England, performing at comedy festivals in Sheffield, Manchester, and Brighton in 2008. They were Hackney New Act & Laughing Horse finalists in 2009, and won an Argus Angel Award for their show at the Brighton Fringe Festival that same year.

Career 
Knappett was the creator, writer, executive producer, and star of the E4 sitcom Drifters, in which she played Meg. She described the show as a semi-autobiographical and therapeutic re-writing of her own history. Owing to the popularity and success of the first series, it was quickly repeated on Channel 4 and later commissioned for a further three seasons. Knappett was nominated for a Royal Television Society Award for Best Comedy writer and Broadcast Award for series 2.

Knappett played Lisa in The Inbetweeners Movie and appeared in the Alan Partridge Movie Alpha Papa and the TV film Irreversible. Other credits include Drunk History for Comedy Central, Mid Morning Matters with Alan Partridge for Sky One, Twenty Twelve for BBC Two, Meet the Parents for E4, and How Not to Live Your Life and Lunch Monkeys for BBC Three. She also played Carly in the BBC Radio 4 comedy series Shedtown alongside Johnny Vegas. She has recorded a string of pilot episodes, including Everything Happens for No Reason written by Richard Herring, alongside Noel Fielding.

Knappett makes frequent appearances on panel shows, including 8 Out of 10 Cats, Hypothetical, and The Last Leg. She has written for The Guardian, The Independent, Glamour, ShortList, and NME. She was a contestant on the seventh season of Dave's comedy gameshow Taskmaster, falling off the stage during a task in one episode. The show has since named the stage she fell from "The Knappett" in her honour.

Personal life 
Knappett married Dan Crane in September 2016. Their first child was born in 2017. Knappett gave birth to her second child, a girl, in April 2022.

Filmography

References

External links 

1984 births
Living people
21st-century English actresses
Alumni of the University of Manchester
English comedy writers
English film actresses
English radio actresses
English stage actresses
English television actresses
People from Bingley
Actresses from Bradford